Jeffery 'Todd' Smith is a former member of the Ohio House of Representatives, representing the 43rd district from 2019 to 2020.  A Republican, Smith previously served as a minister for over twenty years prior to entering politics, including as pastor of the Church at Farmersville and, more recently, a sister church in West Chester. In 2018, Representative Jeff Rezabek opted to not seek reelection, and Smith won the primary to succeed him. In the general election, Smith narrowly defeated Montgomery County Commissioner Daniel Foley by only 87 votes.

References

Links 

 Representative J. Todd Smith (official site)

Living people
Republican Party members of the Ohio House of Representatives
Year of birth missing (living people)
Cincinnati Christian University alumni
21st-century American politicians